Club Deportivo Nueva Puerta Bonita is a Spanish football club based in Carabanchel, city of Madrid, in the namesake autonomous community. Founded in 1942 as Club Deportivo Puerta Bonita, it plays in Tercera División B – Group 7. After a few years holding home games at Antiguo Canódromo de Carabanchel, which has a capacity of 4,000 spectators, the club returned in 2019 to its local stadium, located in Puerta Bonita neighbourhood.

History
Puerta Bonita was founded on April 21, 1942 under the presidency of Julio Barragán, being one of the oldest clubs in the city of Madrid. In the 1989–90 season it made its debuts in the fourth division, category to which it returned five years later, for a much longer spell (one full decade).

In the following years, Puerta Bonita fluctuated between the last division of national football and the regional leagues. The team was noted for its youth football organisation, being one of the clubs with more players in the Community of Madrid.

In 2014, Puerta Bonita promoted for the first time in its history to the third tier, but it was immediately relegated. Two years later, the club was relegated again to Preferente. On 19 September 2016, the day after not entering its game of the round 1, Puerta Bonita announced its withdrew from the competition and its dissolution.

In 2018, the club refounded itself to resolve its difficult financial status.

Season to season

1 season in Segunda División B
20 seasons in Tercera División

Uniform
Standard kit: white shirt, white shorts and white socks.
Alternative kit: green shirt, green shorts and gren socks.

Stadium

Antiguo Canódromo de Carabanchel is located on the Via Carpetana. The stadium, which was previously a greyhound racing track, was completely remodeled by the Madrid city hall, and re-opened in 2007 as a multisports area. 

The ground was opened on 15 May 2007, with a match against Real Madrid Castilla. Before relocating Puerta Bonita historically played at El Hogar, with a 1,000-seat capacity and a dirt track. It belongs to the city council but is still used by the club.

Current squad
As 13 January 2014

Former players
 Enmy Peña
 Eloy
 Jhon
 Óscar
  Dani Evuy
  Andrés Malango

Affiliated clubs
 CD Montijo San Antolín
 CD Oroquieta Villaverde

Curiosity
The film "The World's Longest Penalty" (2004), starring Fernando Tejero, was recorded in the former stadium of Puerta Bonita, El Hogar.

References

External links
Official website 
Futbolme team profile 
Madrid Football Association profile 
Unofficial website 

Defunct football clubs in the Community of Madrid
Football clubs in Madrid
Association football clubs established in 1942
Association football clubs established in 2016
1942 establishments in Spain
Carabanchel